The fourth season of the American television sitcom New Girl premiered on Fox on September 16, 2014, and concluded on May 5, 2015. Season four consisted a total of 22 episodes. Developed by Elizabeth Meriwether under the working title Chicks & Dicks, the series revolves around offbeat teacher Jess (Zooey Deschanel) after her moving into a Los Angeles loft with three men, Nick (Jake Johnson), Schmidt (Max Greenfield), and Winston (Lamorne Morris); Jess' best friend Cece (Hannah Simone) also appears regularly. The show combines comedy and drama elements as the characters, who are in their early thirties, deal with maturing relationships and career choices.

Production
The series was renewed for a fourth season on March 7, 2014. The 22-episode season premiered on September 16, 2014. Beginning this season, Damon Wayans, Jr. was promoted to a series regular. Both Jessica Biel and Reid Scott guest starred in the season premiere. Biel played Kat, "the hottest scientist in the world" who competes with Jess after they both fall for Scott's character Ted, who they both met at a wedding. Kaitlin Olson guest starred as Ashley, Jess' old high school nemesis and Bob Day's much younger fiancée. Michaela Watkins reprised her role as Schmidt's boss Gina. Alan Ritchson guest starred as Matt, an attractive guy that Jess meets at a bar who unfortunately has some shortcomings below the belt.  Julian Morris had a recurring role as Ryan Geauxinue, a handsome teacher that replaces Jess in her old teaching position, and for whom Jess ends up having romantic feelings.

Cast and characters

Main cast
 Zooey Deschanel as Jessica "Jess" Day
 Jake Johnson as Nick Miller
 Max Greenfield as Schmidt
 Lamorne Morris as Winston Bishop
 Hannah Simone as Cece
 Damon Wayans, Jr. as Coach

Recurring cast
 Rob Reiner as Bob Day
 Curtis Armstrong as Principal Foster
 Angela Kinsey as  Rose
 Steve Agee as  Outside Dave
 Brian Posehn as  Biology Teacher
 Jamie Lee Curtis as  Joan
 Julian Morris as  Ryan Geauxinue
 Greta Lee as  Kai
 Zoe Lister-Jones as  Fawn Moscato
 Meaghan Rath as  May
 Nasim Pedrad as  Aly Nelson
 Michaela Watkins as Gina
 Erinn Hayes as Ruth

Guest cast

Episodes

Home media release

Unlike the previous seasons, Fox Home Entertainment instead released the fourth season as a manufacture on demand title that is sold exclusively online.

References

External links

 
 

New Girl
2014 American television seasons
2015 American television seasons